The Pontiac Vibe is a compact car that was sold by Pontiac from 2002 to 2010. It was jointly developed by General Motors along with Toyota, who manufactures the mechanically similar Toyota Matrix. Manufactured by the Toyota-GM joint venture NUMMI in Fremont, California, the Vibe succeeded the Chevrolet Prizm in production at NUMMI and like the Prizm, it was derived from the Toyota Corolla, making it the last of the GM and Toyota developed S-body cars.

From 2002 to 2004, a rebadged right-hand drive variant of the Vibe was exported as the Toyota Voltz to the Japanese domestic market. The Voltz did not sell well in Japan and was discontinued after two model years.

Production of the Vibe ended in 2009 with the discontinuation of the Pontiac brand and the closing of NUMMI under the General Motors Chapter 11 reorganization. Its twin, the Toyota Matrix, was in production for another three years for the American market and four years for the Canadian market, as the Matrix was manufactured by Toyota Motor Manufacturing Canada in Cambridge, Ontario and was unaffected by NUMMI closing down operation.

First generation (2002)

The 2003–2006 Vibe was available in an economical base trim, an AWD mid-trim, and the more powerful GT sport trim.

Powertrains available for this car are a Toyota-built 1.8 L straight-4 16-valve engine producing  on the base model (manual or automatic transmission), 118 hp on the all-wheel drive model (automatic only), or a version with VVTL-i producing  for the GT (manual 6-speed only). The Vibe was at one time the most fuel efficient vehicle sold by GM in North America, but ceased to be the case with the revised United States Environmental Protection Agency testing procedures in 2008.

Although the Vibe and Matrix are similar designs, the two brands actually use several different components, which are brand-specific, for their heating and air conditioning systems. These components include the air conditioning compressor and related hoses, the heater hoses, the heater core, and the serpentine belt.

There were some minor changes between model years. The Vibe was first produced in 2002 and went on sale as a 2003 model. Engine power claims were decreased for 2006 as a result of Toyota's re-testing of its engines for the new Society of Automotive Engineers (SAE) ratings standard. The GT and all-wheel-drive trims were discontinued for the 2007 model year due to poor sales and new federal emissions standards.

The front fascia was freshened in the 2005 model year. In an attempt to 'converge' the Pontiac look, the front grille was restyled to resemble the look of the Pontiac Solstice, also adopted by other vehicles in the Pontiac line.  The 2003-2004 Vibes had a front grille more closely resembling the discontinued Pontiac Aztek.

First generation Vibe/Matrix/Corolla odometers do not have the ability to "roll over" 299,999 km or 299,999 mi.  No recall or "fix" is currently available for this.  Mileage must be kept track of manually until a solution is found.

Toyota Voltz

The Toyota Voltz is a five-door hatchback that was marketed by Toyota from July 2002 to March 2004 in its home market of Japan.  Manufactured by NUMMI alongside the Vibe, the Voltz was exported to Japan in place of the Toyota Matrix.  In Japan, the model line was exclusive to Toyota Japanese dealerships called Toyota Netz Store.

With the exception of badging, the Voltz shared its exterior with the Vibe, including its Pontiac-designed twin front grilles. Along with the customary fitment of right-hand drive, the Voltz differed from the Vibe by sharing its interior design with the Matrix. With just over 10,000 units sold, Toyota ended sales of the Voltz with the Toyota Auris as its closest functional successor.

Second generation (2008) 

The Vibe was redesigned, along with the Matrix, for the 2009 model year, and debuted at the December 2007 LA Auto Show. First deliveries to dealerships were posted on GM's Website in April 2008, with comments that initial sales were brisk. The first units were delivered to buyers in early March. "The new Vibe's design is sporty yet completely functional," according to Ron Aselton, chief designer. "Clean lines, minimal overhangs, and wheels pushed to the corners give the vehicle a muscular stance."

The GT trim and AWD options return, and two new inline-four engines (Toyota's 2.4-liter 2AZ-FE was also used on the Camry (and the 2005–2008 RAV4) for the AWD and GT trims as well as optional on the base trim, and a new 1.8-liter 2ZR-FE standard on the base trim) are offered. This was also Pontiac's last new model and remained as the brand's only remaining car for the 2010 model year. GM ceased Vibe's production in August 2009.

The second generation FWD Vibes also offer computerized traction-control and anti-lock brakes. Rear disc brakes are standard on all models. Luggage racks are no longer standard order.

Discontinuation 
On April 27, 2009, GM announced the discontinuation of Vibe production, as well as all other Pontiac models, by the end of 2010. It was later announced that Vibe production would end in August 2009, and the last Vibe left the assembly line on August 17, 2009, according to a source at genvibe.com. This left Toyota with a major problem as they had to scramble to relocate some of the tooling that was jointly used to produce the Matrix in another factory.

GM did not initially produce a compact hatchback to succeed the Pontiac Vibe, choosing to bracket it with the Chevrolet Sonic hatchback and Buick Encore small crossover.  In Canada, GM followed the Vibe with the larger Chevrolet Orlando compact MPV, which replaced the Chevrolet HHR.  Chevrolet introduced a hatchback version of the Chevrolet Cruze to North America in 2016.

Recalls 
In January 2010, Autoblog.com reported that the 2009 and 2010 model year Pontiac Vibes are also included in the 2009–2010 Toyota vehicle recalls related to unintended acceleration due to shared components with the Toyota Matrix.  Another recall for the Vibe was issued in the Fall of 2009 due to floormat interference with the accelerator pedals. This is also part of the Toyota recall.

On August 26, 2010, another recall was issued for 2005 to 2008 model year Vibes, equipped with the 1ZZ-FE engine and two-wheel drive. The recall notices states that an improperly manufactured Engine Control Module (ECM) can develop a crack in its circuitry, potentially causing the "Check Engine" light to illuminate, harsh shifting, and stalling and/or failure of the engine to start.

In mid-October 2014 the Vibe along with the Saab 9-2x was recalled due to the faulty Takata airbags supplied from the large airbag supplier company. It is undetermined how many Vibes have been recalled.

Sales

References

External links

Official website
Pontiac Vibe at The Crittenden Automotive Library

 

All-wheel-drive vehicles
Cars introduced in 2002
Compact cars
Front-wheel-drive vehicles
Hatchbacks
Motor vehicles manufactured in the United States
Vibe
Sport compact cars